Corey Lawrie (born 15 February 1980) is a New Zealand rugby league footballer who is the player-coach of the Hornby Panthers. His position of choice is at lock-forward.

Background
Lawrie was born in Christchurch, New Zealand.

Playing career
Lawrie has previously represented the Canterbury Bulls in the Bartercard Cup, the Auckland Lions in the NSWRL Premier League, and the New Zealand Warriors in the Telstra Premiership. He made his first grade début for the Warriors on 15 April 2007 against the North Queensland Cowboys.

After being released by the Warriors, Lawrie joined Doncaster in National League Two in England.

In 2009 Lawrie returned to Christchurch and his junior club, the Hornby Panthers.

Lawrie was named in a West Coast XIII to play in a curtain raiser match against Canterbury on 4 February 2011. The match is before the New Zealand Warriors v Newcastle Knights preseason charity match that will raise money for the Pike River Mine disaster trust. He became the player-coach of the Panthers for the 2011 season.

Lawrie represented the Canterbury Bulls in the National Competition in 2014.

References

External links 
Official player profile

1980 births
Living people
Auckland rugby league team players
Canterbury rugby league team players
Doncaster R.L.F.C. players
Hornby Panthers players
New Zealand rugby league coaches
New Zealand rugby league players
New Zealand Warriors players
Rugby league locks
Rugby league players from Christchurch
West Coast rugby league team players